Lee Jun-hyung (born March 9, 1997) is a South Korean curler from Uijeongbu, Gyeonggi-do, South Korea. While playing lead for Jeong Yeong-seok, his team won the 2020 Korean Curling Championships and later represented South Korea at the 2021 World Men's Curling Championship.

Career
In 2020, Lee and his team of Jeong Yeong-seok, Kim San, Park Se-won and Kim Seung-min won the 2020 Korean Curling Championships. After losing the 1 vs. 2 page playoff game, his team defeated Kim Soo-hyuk 8–7 in the semifinal and upset defending champions Kim Chang-min 12–10 in the final. Their win earned them the right to represent South Korea at the 2021 World Men's Curling Championship in Calgary, Alberta. For the championship, the team altered their lineup, bringing Kim Jeong-min and Seo Min-guk in to replace Kim San and Kim Seung-min. At the Worlds, they finished with a 2–11 record.

Personal life
Lee is a full-time curler.

Teams

References

External links

1997 births
Living people
South Korean male curlers
People from Uijeongbu
Sportspeople from Gyeonggi Province
21st-century South Korean people